Henry Tuchet, 10th Baron Audley, 7th Baron Tuchet (died 30 December 1563) was an English peer.

Henry Tuchet was the son of George Tuchet, 9th Baron Audley (died 1560). He married Elizabeth Sneyd, daughter of Sir William Sneyd ( or Suede ). He inherited his title on the death of his father.

He died on 30 December 1563 and was buried in Betley, Staffordshire. He was succeeded by his son, George Tuchet, 11th Baron Audley (c. 1561 - 1616), who was made 1st Earl of Castlehaven at the end of his life.

Family

Issue 
 George Tuchet, 11th Baron Audley
 Jakob

References
 ThePeerage.com entry
Notes

|-

Year of birth missing
1563 deaths
16th-century English nobility
10